Silvia Cuminetti (born 29 January 1985), is an Italian ski mountaineer.

Cuminetti was born in Bergamo. She started ski mountaineering in 2001 and competed first in the "Gara in Val di Rezzalo" race in Bormio in the same year. She has been a member of the national team since 2002. She is a member of the CAMOSCI-Gruppo Alpinisti Bergamaschi.

Selected results 
 2007:
 3rd, European Championship vertical race "espoirs" class
 4th, European Championship single race "espoirs" class
 8th, World Cup total ranking (3rd, "espoirs" class ranking)
 2008:
 9th, World Championship team race (together with Tamara Lunger)

Pierra Menta 

 2007: 1st, "espoirs" class race together with Tamara Lunger
 2010: 10th, together with Cristina Foppoli

Trofeo Mezzalama 

 2007: 5th, together with Tamara Lunger and Fabienne Chanoine

External links 
 Respirare un'aria diversa! - intervista a Silvia Cuminetti (Italian), CAMOSCI
 Silvia Cuminetti at skimountaineering.org

References 

1985 births
Living people
Italian female ski mountaineers
Sportspeople from Bergamo